Megachile heinii is a species of bee in the family Megachilidae. It was described by Kohl in 1906.

References

Heinii
Insects described in 1906